Bovee is an unincorporated community in Charles Mix County, in the U.S. state of South Dakota.

History
A post office called Bovee was established in 1916, and remained in operation until 1955. The community has the name of M. Bovee, a pioneer settler.

References

Unincorporated communities in Charles Mix County, South Dakota
Unincorporated communities in South Dakota